Salomea Deszner, née Teschner, Teszner (1759-20 March 1806), was a Polish stage actress, opera singer and theater director, active 1777–1806.

Her father Adam Teschnerów was employed in the household of the Branicki family, and she was noticed by the king and engaged at his theater. She was employed at the National Theatre, Warsaw in 1777-85 and 1789–96, and in the theater in Vilnius in 1785-89 and 1796–1801. She was the director of the theater in Grodno from 1802 until 1806, and as such had authority over the theatrical policy in the entire district. As an actor, she was regarded as belonging to the elite in Poland, and she was active in tragedy, comedy and opera, was famed in breeches roles, and particularly known for the part of Minna von Barnhelm. She participated in the first opera buffa in Poland, Dla miłości zmyślone szaleństwo (1779).

References 

 Źródło: Słownik Biograficzny Teatru Polskiego 1765–1965, PWN Warszawa 1973

19th-century Polish actresses
1759 births
1806 deaths
18th-century Polish–Lithuanian opera singers
Polish theatre directors
18th-century Polish–Lithuanian actresses
19th-century Polish women opera singers
Artists from Białystok